Jubilee apple is a modern cultivar of dessert apple, which was developed in the Canadian province of British Columbia by the Summerland Research Station.

It is a cross between two very popular apples, the McIntosh and Grimes Golden. The flavor is sweet, like its McIntosh parent it is crispy only while just picked. Skin is flushed red over greenish yellow.

See also
 List of Canadian inventions and discoveries
 Ambrosia (apple)
 McIntosh (apple)
 Spartan (apple)
Delbard Jubilee

References

Apple cultivars